Gerald Uglem (born September 18, 1947) is an American politician who served in the North Dakota House of Representatives from the 19th district from 2002 to 2010 and in the North Dakota Senate from the 19th district from 2010 to 2012.

References

1947 births
Living people
Republican Party members of the North Dakota House of Representatives
Republican Party North Dakota state senators